François Hélary (14 March 1924 – 29 August 1995) was a French racing cyclist. He rode in the 1948 Tour de France.

References

External links
 

1924 births
1995 deaths
French male cyclists
People from Morlaix
Sportspeople from Finistère
Cyclists from Brittany